Gabriel Antonio Méndez (born 8 May 1988) nicknamed "El correntino", is an Argentine professional footballer who is currently a free agent. He plays as an attacking midfielder or striker.

Career
Méndez started his playing career in 2007 with Racing Club, in which he had been playing in the youth teams. However, he couldn't establish himself as a regular first team player and could only play 5 matches coming in as a substitute. In 2009, he joined Ecuadorian side Olmedo, in which he played 28 matches and scored 7 goals. After 6 months in Olmedo, he joined Deportivo Cuenca, in which he played 21 matches, scoring 6 goals, 3 of them in 2010 Copa Libertadores (2 against Banfield, his future club, and 1 against Monarcas Morelia). In July 2010, Méndez joined Banfield on a 1-year loan.

On 18 October 2019, Méndez agreed to a one year deal with Hong Kong club Pegasus. He left the club on 17 December 2019, claiming that he could not adapt to the football environment of Hong Kong.

However, only 2 weeks later on 1 January 2020, Méndez signed for another Hong Kong Premier League club, Southern. His time with Southern ended on 20 April when he agreed to an early termination with the club due to financial difficulties caused by the 2020 coronavirus pandemic.

In November 2020, Méndez returned to Ecuador and signed with his former club, LDU Portoviejo. The season ended with relegation to the Ecuadorian Serie B. Méndez left LDU in June 2021, due to lack of playing time. In August 2021, he signed a short-term contract with C.D. Olmedo. In November 2021, it was reported - however, not officially - that he had left Olmedo, before he had even played for the club.

References

External links
 
 
 
 
 

1988 births
Living people
People from Paso de los Libres
Argentine footballers
Argentine expatriate footballers
Association football midfielders
Association football forwards
Atlético Tucumán footballers
Club Atlético Banfield footballers
Cobreloa footballers
Unión Española footballers
C.D. Olmedo footballers
San Lorenzo de Almagro footballers
C.D. Cuenca footballers
Racing Club de Avellaneda footballers
L.D.U. Portoviejo footballers
TSW Pegasus FC players
Chilean Primera División players
Argentine Primera División players
Hong Kong Premier League players
Southern District FC players
Expatriate footballers in Chile
Expatriate footballers in Ecuador
Expatriate footballers in Hong Kong
Argentine expatriate sportspeople in Chile
Argentine expatriate sportspeople in Ecuador
Argentine expatriate sportspeople in Hong Kong
Sportspeople from Corrientes Province